The 1954 NCAA Golf Championship was the 16th annual NCAA-sanctioned golf tournament to determine the individual and team national champions of men's collegiate golf in the United States.

The tournament was held at the Braeburn Country Club in Houston, Texas, co-hosted by the University of Houston and Rice University.

SMU won the team title, the Mustangs' NCAA team national title.

Individual results

Individual champion
 Hillman Robbins, Memphis State

Tournament medalist
 Don Albert, Purdue (136)

Team results

Note: Top 10 only
DC = Defending champions

References

NCAA Men's Golf Championship
Golf in Texas
NCAA Golf Championship
NCAA Golf Championship
NCAA Golf Championship